The 1955 Soviet Chess Championship was the 22nd edition of USSR Chess Championship. Held from 11 February to 15 March 1955 in Moscow. The tournament was won by Efim Geller who defeats Smyslov in a play-off match (4-3). The final were preceded semifinals events at Leningrad, Gorky and Yerevan. It was the worst USSR Chess Championship of Korchnoi's career, despite having fought in each game, all showing the high level of the competition.

Table and results

Play-off match

References 

USSR Chess Championships
Championship
Chess
1955 in chess
Chess